Kamil Zapolnik (born 9 September 1992) is a Polish professional footballer who plays as a forward for Puszcza Niepołomice.

Club career
On 4 August 2020, he signed with Miedź Legnica. On 22 February 2023, Zapolnik moved to I liga side Puszcza Niepołomice on a two-and-a-half-year deal.

Honours
Miedź Legnica
I liga: 2021–22

References

1992 births
Sportspeople from Białystok
Living people
Polish footballers
Association football forwards
Olimpia Zambrów players
Wigry Suwałki players
GKS Tychy players
Górnik Zabrze players
Miedź Legnica players
Puszcza Niepołomice players
Ekstraklasa players
I liga players
II liga players
III liga players